Horní Radechová is a municipality and village in Náchod District in the Hradec Králové Region of the Czech Republic. It has about 500 inhabitants.

Administrative parts
The village of Slavíkov is an administrative part of Horní Radechová.

Notable people
Antonín Chráska (1868–1953), Protestant missionary, translator and theologian

References

Villages in Náchod District